The Villa de Leon, also known as the Kauffman Estate, is a historic 35-room,  Italian Revival mansion in the Castellemmare neighborhood of Malibu, California.  

The mansion overlooks Pacific Coast Highway and the Pacific Ocean and is situated in close proximity to the Getty Villa. It was designed by prominent Los Angeles architect Kenneth A. MacDonald Jr. in 1926 for Austrian builder and investor in wool Leon Kauffman and his wife Clemence.

The building has 35 rooms, including 9 bedrooms, 11 bathrooms, a grand salon (32 x 64 ft.), a library, a circular dining room, a butler’s pantry, an elevator and a seven-car garage. The construction price of Villa de Leon was $1 million (equivalent to ~$17 million in 2022) and included a central vacuum, hand-made crystal chandeliers, Italian tiles with gold grouting, imported marbles, hand-carved wooden beams, mahogany paneling from Thailand, wrought-iron gates. The Villa de Leon took about five years to complete.

In popular culture 
Villa de Leon has been used in many high-profile music videos, commercials and printed ads, such as Beyonce's "Haunted," Lady Gaga's "Paparazzi," Britney Spears's "My Prerogative" body fragrance commercial, Camila Cabello's "Liar", Ariana Grande, Miley Cyrus and Lana Del Rey's "Don't Call Me Angel", Taemin's "Press Your Number", Rod Stewart's Christmas special Rod Stewart: Merry Christmas, Baby, and shoots featuring Heidi Klum, Victoria Beckham, Robert Pattinson and Reese Witherspoon. 

Its highly recognizable grand staircase has been a major focal point in several of these videos and photographs, as has its balconies and their balustrades, including their appearance on the cover of English rock band Procol Harum's 1973 album, Grand Hotel.

In 2011, Foster The People filmed music video for the song Call It What You Want and in 2019, Tyler, the Creator's music video "A BOY IS A GUN*" was filmed in the villa.

References

Buildings and structures in Malibu, California
Residential buildings completed in 1926
1926 establishments in California